The 2010 Tashkent Challenger was a professional tennis tournament played on hard courts. It was the third edition of the tournament which is part of the 2010 ATP Challenger Tour. It took place in Tashkent, Uzbekistan between 12 and 17 October 2010.

ATP entrants

Seeds

 Rankings are as of October 4, 2010.

Other entrants
The following players received wildcards into the singles main draw:
  Farrukh Dustov
  Murad Inoyatov
  Sergey Shipilov
  Vaja Uzakov

The following players received entry as an alternate into the singles main draw:
  Noam Okun

The following players received entry from the qualifying draw:
  Rameez Junaid
  Ante Pavić
  Vasek Pospisil
  Clément Reix

Champions

Singles

 Karol Beck def.  Gilles Müller, 6–7(4), 6–4, 7–5

Doubles

 Ross Hutchins /  Jamie Murray def.  Karol Beck /  Filip Polášek, 2–6, 6–4, [10–8]

External links
Official website
ITF Search 
ATP official site

Tashkent Challenger
Tashkent Challenger